Jared Anderson is a Christian worship leader from Colorado Springs, Colorado. He grew up in the New Life Church where he served for many years as part of New Life Worship and the Desperation Band. Anderson has released four solo albums with Integrity Music, titled Where to Begin (2006), Where Faith Comes From (2008), LIVE From My Church (2009) and The Narrow Road (2012).

Discography 

2001: 12 Off the Shelf (independent)
2006: Where to Begin (Integrity Music)
2006: Arise: A Celebration of Worship (Integrity Music)
2008: Where Faith Comes From (Integrity Music)
2008: Two Days In the Same Place (independent)
2009: People of Troy (independent)
2009: Live from My Church (Integrity Music)
2012: The Narrow Road (Integrity Music)
2014: We Belong to Jesus (Integrity Music)

EPs
2015: Where I Am Right Now
2019: The Whole Landscape

Notes

References
"Where To Begin Review". Retrieved 2008-08-07.
 Farias, Andree. "Where Faith Comes From Review" Retrieved 2008-08-07.

External links 
 Artist's Label Page

Living people
Musicians from Colorado
Performers of contemporary worship music
American performers of Christian music
Year of birth missing (living people)